Madlamark Church is a parish church of the Church of Norway in the southern part of the large Stavanger Municipality in Rogaland county, Norway. It is located in the Madlamark neighborhood in the borough of Madla in the western part of the city of Stavanger. It is the church for the Madlamark parish which is part of the Ytre Stavanger prosti (deanery) in the Diocese of Stavanger. The large, brick church was built in a fan-shaped design in 1976 using designs by the architect Toralf Kaada. The church seats about 600 people.

See also
List of churches in Rogaland

References

Churches in Stavanger
Brick churches in Norway
20th-century Church of Norway church buildings
Churches completed in 1976
1976 establishments in Norway